Mackenzie Woodring is an American cyclist who won a gold medal at the 2008 Summer Paralympics in Beijing, China. Woodring was selected for the 2015 UCI Para-cycling Road World Championships (Team USA) and 2016 Summer Paralympics (tandem paracycling, with stoker Shawn Cheshire).

Biography
Woodring's cycling career started with an introduction to recreational riding in 2004, then progressed quickly. Woodring was recruited to the Colavita/Sutter Home professional cycling team for the 2008 season after riding with Jamaican Olympian  Iona Wynter Park and U.S. criterium champion Tina Pic during a warmup for the 2007 Tour de Leelanau.

References

Living people
American female cyclists
Paralympic cyclists of the United States
Cyclists at the 2004 Summer Paralympics
Cyclists at the 2016 Summer Paralympics
Paralympic gold medalists for the United States
Year of birth missing (living people)
Place of birth missing (living people)
Sportspeople from Michigan
Paralympic silver medalists for the United States
Medalists at the 2008 Summer Paralympics
Paralympic medalists in cycling
21st-century American women